American rapper Azealia Banks has appeared in twenty-three music videos, two films, one television program and two commercials. As a teenager, Banks studied at the LaGuardia High School of Performing Arts in Manhattan. A film opportunity arose through the school, and at the age of fourteen, Banks featured in the film The American Ruling Class, portraying a singer and a dancer in a cameo role. In 2010, Banks' first music video was released for a demo track titled "L8R", which would go on to be included on her debut mixtape Fantasea two years later. The following year, Banks' second music video was released for her breakout single "212", and has since amassed over two-hundred million views on Banks' official YouTube channel. During the promotional campaign of Banks' debut EP 1991, all songs on the project received a video treatment, including her sophomore single "Liquorice", shot by acclaimed director Rankin. Months after the video for "Liquorice" was released, an alternate version was leaked. In July 2012, Banks released her debut mixtape Fantasea. To promote the mixtape, Banks released three music videos for tracks on the project, "Luxury", "Atlantis", and "Fierce", the latter being shot with clothing company ASOS.

In 2012, Banks starred in two commercials for companies, the first was for Alexander Wang, in which she promoted the T by Alexander Wang clothing line, while the second commercial she appeared in was for Beats Electronics, in which she promoted Beats by Dr. Dre. In 2013, Banks released videos for two singles, "Yung Rapunxel" and "ATM Jam", and videos for collaborations with Shystie and Baauer. Throughout 2014, Banks released videos to promote her debut studio album Broke with Expensive Taste, including videos for "Heavy Metal and Reflective" and "Chasing Time". In March 2015, Banks released an interactive video for the song "Wallace", which received critical acclaim, with Paper ranking it as one of the most underrated videos from the prior year. In 2017, Banks starred in the film Love Beats Rhymes, playing the lead role of Coco, directed by RZA.

Music videos

Films

Television

Commercials

References

Videographies of American artists
American filmographies